Tarnawatka Transmitter is a radio-television transmitting centre located in the village of Tarnawatka near Zamość. The 154 metre guyed steel mast was built in 1984 in order to provide radio and television coverage in Zamość Voivodeship and the surrounding areas. It is a broadcasting station of about medium powers and reception is also possible in the westmost areas of Ukraine. The transmitter is owned by the EmiTel company.

Transmitted programmes

Digital television MPEG-4

FM radio

See also 
 Multiplex communication
 List of tallest structures in Poland

External links 
 http://emi.emitel.pl/EMITEL/obiekty.aspx?obiekt=DODR_E1J
 http://radiopolska.pl/wykaz/pokaz_lokalizacja.php?pid=110
 http://www.przelaczenie.eu/mapy/lubelskie
 http://www.dvbtmap.eu/mapcoverage.html?chid=9643

Towers completed in 1984
Radio masts and towers in Poland
Tomaszów Lubelski County